The Public Health (London) Act 1891 (54 & 55 Vict c 76) was an Act of the Parliament of the United Kingdom which extended access to Metropolitan Asylums Board hospitals to those who were not eligible for poor relief.

The act transferred responsibility for removing snow from footpaths from individual householders to the London vestries and district boards.

See also
 Healthcare in London
Public Health Act

References

External links
References in Hansard

Poor Law in Britain and Ireland
United Kingdom Acts of Parliament 1891
1891 in London
Acts of the Parliament of the United Kingdom concerning London
Health in London
Poor law infirmaries